Genelle Williams (born February 18, 1984) is a Canadian actress who is best known for her roles as Kim Carlisle in Radio Free Roscoe, as DJ in The Latest Buzz, and as the innkeeper Leena in Warehouse 13.

Career
Acting in high school led to the beginning of Williams's professional career when a teacher saw her perform in a musical and recommended an agent to Williams.

Williams's first notable role was on the Family's Radio Free Roscoe, which aired between 2002 and 2004. In 2003, she played Kim Carlisle, a DJ for "Cougar Radio", and love interest of Robert McGrath. Over three years, she also played multiple roles on the popular CTV series Degrassi: The Next Generation.

After taking a break in her career, she appeared in the Family’s new show, The Latest Buzz, as Diane Jeffreys (abbreviated "DJ"), the editor and supervisor of the young writers of Teen Buzz. She then portrayed Leena on the Syfy series Warehouse 13 from the series's start in July 2009 until the midpoint of season four in October 2012.  In 2014, Williams appeared in Lifetime's The Lottery. Williams has recurring roles on Remedy and Bitten.

Williams' film work includes It's a Boy Girl Thing, The Incredible Hulk, and Orphan.

Filmography

Film

Television

References

External links

1984 births
Black Canadian actresses
Canadian television actresses
Canadian people of African-American descent
Living people
Actresses from Toronto
Canadian film actresses